The Secunda is the second column of Origen's Hexapla, a compilation of the Hebrew Bible and Greek versions. It consists of a transliteration of the Hebrew text of the Hebrew Bible into Greek characters. As such it serves as an important document for Hebrew philology, in particular the study of Biblical Hebrew phonology.

Authorship 
There is contention as to whether the Secunda was written by Origen, a contemporary, or was a copy of a preexisting older text. Some suppose that Origen wrote the text himself, perhaps with Jewish helpers. Others suppose that the Secunda was a preexisting text, added into the Hexapla as an aid for the reader. There is evidence that Jews of the time made use of transcriptions; for instance a passage in the Jerusalem Talmud describing how the Jews of Caesarea would misread the tetragrammaton as the graphically similar <πιπι>, suggesting the use of transcribed texts with the tetragrammaton preserved in Hebrew characters. There is also phonetic evidence for the Secunda being a preexisting text. By the time of Origen <η αι> were pronounced [iː ɛː], a merger which had already begun around 100 BCE, while in the Secunda they are used to represent Hebrew /eː aj/.

Orthography 
The text of the Secunda uses various Greek diacritics:

A diaeresis is used on the character iota (<ι> to <ϊ>) precisely when iota occurs after a vowel, except when <ει> indicates /iː/. This is completely independent of whether the segment is consonantal or vocalic in Hebrew, as the following examples attest:
 <αλαϊ> /a.la.i/ = Tiberian /ʕaːlaj/
 <φεδιων> /pʰɛ.di.on/ = Tiberian /piːð.joːn/
The diaeresis was a later addition of the 8th or 9th century to the Secunda.

The use of rough and smooth breathing signs does not follow an obvious pattern; for example, compare <ἀμιμ> /a.mim/ = Tiberian /ʕam'miːm/ versus <ἁφαρ> /(h)a.pʰar/ = Tiberian /ʕaːfaːr/. These signs were also an addition of the 8th or 9th century.

The use of accents in the Secunda does not correspond with stress in Masoretic Hebrew; their presence remains a puzzle.

References

Bibliography

External links
 Benjamin P Kantor, The Second Column (Secunda) of Origen's Hexapla in Light of Greek Pronunciation

3rd-century Christian texts
Lost religious texts
Early versions of the Bible
Works by Origen
Christian terminology
Hebrew language
Transliteration
Afroasiatic phonologies